3C 452 is a Seyfert galaxy located in the constellation Lacerta.

References

External links
 www.jb.man.ac.uk/atlas/ (J. P. Leahy)

Radio galaxies
Seyfert galaxies
Lacerta (constellation)
452
3C 452